Schistophragma is a genus of flowering plants belonging to the family Plantaginaceae.

Its native range is Arizona to New Mexico and Colombia.

Species
Species:

Schistophragma intermedium 
Schistophragma mexicanum 
Schistophragma polystachyum 
Schistophragma pusillum

References

Plantaginaceae
Plantaginaceae genera